Tienie Britz (born 14 May 1945) is a South African professional golfer.

Britz was born in Johannesburg. He won the South African PGA Championship twice in 1971 and led the South African Tour Order of Merit in 1971/72. He has also played extensively on the European Tour and the European Seniors Tour. His best finish on the European Tour was nineteenth in 1977, which was the year he won his only European Tour title at the German Open, having had to pre-qualify first. Britz represented South Africa three times in the World Cup: in Australia with Gary Player, in Thailand with John Bland and in Columbia with Bobby Verwey.

Since 1986, Britz has been the head teaching professional at Broome Park Golf Club in Barham, near Canterbury, Kent, England.

Professional wins

European Tour wins

Southern Africa wins
This list is incomplete
1969 Bush Babes Open
1971 South African PGA Championship (Feb), Bush Babes Open, South African PGA Championship (Nov)
1972 Natal Open
1979 Kalahari Classic
1980 Kalahari Classic

Results in major championships

Note: Britz only played in The Open Championship.

CUT = missed the half-way cut (3rd round cut in 1981 Open Championship)
"T" indicates a tie for a place

Team appearances
World Cup (representing South Africa): 1972, 1975, 1980

References

External links

South African male golfers
Sunshine Tour golfers
European Tour golfers
European Senior Tour golfers
Golfers from Johannesburg
People from Kent
1945 births
Living people